Ognjen Filipović (born 17 October 1973 in Sremska Mitrovica) is a Serbian sprint canoer who competed for Serbia and Montenegro and later Serbia. He won six medals at the ICF Canoe Sprint World Championships with two golds (K-2 200 m: 2005 for Serbia and Montenegro, K-4 200 m: 2006 for Serbia), a silver K-4 200 m: 2007 for Serbia), and three bronzes (K-1 200 m: 1998 for Yugoslavia, K-2 200 m: 2006 for Serbia, 2007 for Serbia).

Filipović also competed in two Summer Olympics, both for Serbia and Montenegro. At the 2000 Summer Olympics in Sydney, he was eliminated in the semifinal round of the K-1 500 m event. Four years later, Filipović was eliminated in the semifinals again, both in the K-2 500 m and K-2 1000 m events.

Filipović, nicknamed Ogi, is a member of the Čačak canoe club.

References

Sports-reference.com profile
Srem Portal - Filipović Ognjen

1973 births
Canoeists at the 2000 Summer Olympics
Canoeists at the 2004 Summer Olympics
Living people
Olympic canoeists of Serbia and Montenegro
Serbian male canoeists
Serbia and Montenegro male canoeists
Yugoslav male canoeists
ICF Canoe Sprint World Championships medalists in kayak
Sportspeople from Sremska Mitrovica
European champions for Serbia

Mediterranean Games bronze medalists for Serbia
Competitors at the 2005 Mediterranean Games
Mediterranean Games medalists in canoeing